Jerzy Nowicki (2 January 1933 – December 2013) was a Polish sport shooter who competed in the 1960 Summer Olympics, in the 1964 Summer Olympics, and in the 1968 Summer Olympics.

References

1933 births
2013 deaths
Polish male sport shooters
ISSF rifle shooters
Olympic shooters of Poland
Shooters at the 1960 Summer Olympics
Shooters at the 1964 Summer Olympics
Shooters at the 1968 Summer Olympics
People from Polesie Voivodeship
20th-century Polish people